The Kadamba script is the first writing system devised specifically for writing Kannada and Telugu. It is a descendant of the Brahmi script. The Kadamba script is also known as Pre-Old-Kannada script.

The Kadamba script is one of the oldest of the southern group of Brahmic scripts that evolved from the Brahmi script. By the 5th century CE it became distinct from other Brahmi variants and was used in southern Indian states of Karnataka and Andhra Pradesh. It evolved into the Old Kannada script by the 10th century CE and was used to write Kannada and Telugu. It is also related to the Sinhala script.

History

During the rule of Kadamba dynasty (325-550), major change in the Brahmi script resulted in the Kadamba Kannada script, letters were shorter and round in shape. During (325 to 1000 AD) the rule of the Western Ganga dynasty in the southern parts of Karnataka the Kannada script used differently (also known as Ganga script) in rock edicts and copper plate inscriptions. 
During 6th to 10th century, the Kannada-Telugu alphabet stabilized during the rule of the Chalukyas of Badami from 500-1000 and Rastrakutas.

Inscriptions in Kadamba script

 Gudnapur Inscription on 20-foot-long stone pillar written in Kadamba script
 Copper plate inscriptions in Kadamba (Pre - Chalukya) script, Kadamba-Pallava script, Kannada-Telugu script are available at Chennai museum
 Halmidi inscription
 Talagunda pillar inscription

See also
Ancient Philippine scripts
Kalinga script
Kannada script
Palaeography-Kannada
Telugu script

References

External links
 Evolution of Kannada script 
 ||The story of Indian scripts - Evolution
 Chalukya Kannada script 690 AD
 Chalukya Kannada script 578 AD
 Vengi Kannada script 4th century AD
 Pyu script Pallava a Pyu equivalent script
 Ancient scripts timeline - Kadamba scripts
 Indus writing is multilingual: a part-syllabic system at work
 Indian Scripts -Brahmi to Devanagari
 South Asian Writing Systems
 Development of Brahmi script, second column is Kadamba script
 Coins of Kadambas os Banavasi
 Comparison of Brahmi and Kadamba-Pallava script (Salankayana script)
 Evolution of Telugu Character Graphs
 Important Discoveries in the recent past Andhra Pradesh

Kannada literature
Brahmic scripts
Alphabets
Linguistic history of India